Field Studies Council is an educational charity based in the UK, which offers opportunities for people to learn about and engage with the outdoors.

History
It was established as the Council for the Promotion of Field Studies in 1943 with the vision to provide opportunities for school children to study plants and animals in their natural environment. It subsequently became a nationwide provider of outdoor education, delivering opportunities for people of all ages and abilities to discover explore the environment in many different forms, and has established a network of field centres providing facilities for people wanting to study natural history, ecology and the environment.

Activities
Field Studies Council provides outdoor educational residential or day visits from the organisation's centres, and other outreach areas, including London parks. 

The centres include:
 Amersham Field Centre, Buckinghamshire
Bishops Wood, Worcestershire
Blencathra, Cumbria
Castle Head, Grange-over-Sands, Cumbria
 Dale Fort, Pembrokeshire
Epping Forest, Essex 
 Flatford Mill, Colchester
Juniper Hall, Surrey
London Parks: Bushy Park, Greenwich Park and Regent's Park
 Margam Park, Neath Port Talbot
Millport, North Ayrshire
Nettlecombe Court, Somerset
Preston Montford, Shropshire
Rhyd-y-creuau, Conwy 
Slapton Ley, Devon 

The Field Studies Council creates a programme covering a wide variety of outdoor education, including fieldwork opportunities in geography and biology, providing fieldwork opportunities to allow students to investigative practical skills and to be given the chance to evaluate and analyse data they collect themselves, and data already held by the organisation. 

The Field Studies Council also publishes fold-out charts and guides. BioLinks South East and BioLinks West Midlands are lottery funded schemes set up to strengthen UK biological recording.

With the goal of promoting and improving geography fieldwork, the Field Studies Council has entered into a partnership with The Geographical Association. Together, they work towards creating cases for geography and fieldwork within policy, and creating resources for education and career development.

Partnerships projects include:

 Forgotten Places: Greening Coastal Towns and Cities 
 The Generation Green project Access Unlimited
 Mission:Invertebrate
 Our Bright Future
 Nature Friendly Schools
 Work to change policy within education to include environmental studies to school and college students

References

External links
 Field Studies Council

1943 establishments in the United Kingdom
Scientific organizations established in 1943
Charities based in Shropshire
Ecology organizations
Environmental organisations based in the United Kingdom
Educational charities based in the United Kingdom
Publishing companies of the United Kingdom